Iran System encoding was an 8-bit character encoding scheme and was created by Iran System corporation for Persian language support. This encoding was in use in Iran in DOS-based programs and after the introduction of Microsoft code page 1256 this encoding became obsolete. However, some Windows and DOS programs using this encoding are still in use and some Windows fonts with this encoding exist. Now most programs use code page 1256 or Unicode.

Character set
Only the upper half (128–255) of the table is shown, the lower half (0–127) is the same as code page 437. This character set encodes distinct visual forms separately.

 * Position used for all forms of the letter.
 † Initial or medial form.
 ‡ Final or isolated form.

References

 Iran system charmap.png

DOS code pages